Aerography may refer to:
Aerography (arts), a stencilling method in the visual arts
Aerography (meteorology), the production of weather charts

See also
Aerial photography, the taking of photographs from an aircraft